The 2017–18 Buffalo Sabres season was the 48th season for the National Hockey League franchise that was established on May 22, 1970. The Sabres missed the playoffs again, finishing last in the division for the second straight year and last overall in the league.

Standings

Off-season
General manager Tim Murray and head coach Dan Bylsma were both fired at the end of the previous season. Two former Sabres players were hired in their places: Jason Botterill, at the time a front office executive with the Pittsburgh Penguins, was hired as general manager, while Hockey Hall of Fame defenseman Phil Housley, at the time defensive coordinator for the Nashville Predators, was named head coach.

The Sabres once again held a summer development camp during the second week of July. In contrast to the previous two seasons, no full Blue/White game was played; the four-team three-on-three tournament was reprised. Team White, led by 2017 first-round draft pick Casey Mittelstadt, won the tournament. The team will host its third annual Prospects Challenge in September; the tournament will expand to four teams, with the Pittsburgh Penguins joining the returning Sabres, New Jersey Devils and Boston Bruins in the tournament.

Schedule and results

Preseason
The Sabres released their preseason schedule on June 19, 2017.

Regular season
The team's regular season schedule was published on June 22, 2017.

Player statistics
Final stats.
Skaters

Goaltenders

†Denotes player spent time with another team before joining the Sabres. Stats reflect time with the Sabres only.
‡Denotes player was traded mid-season. Stats reflect time with the Sabres only.
Bold/italics denotes franchise record.

Transactions
The Sabres have been involved in the following transactions during the 2017–18 season.

Trades

Notes:
 The Vegas Golden Knights selected William Carrier in the 2017 NHL Expansion Draft. The draft pick was exchanged so that the Golden Knights would not select Linus Ullmark.

Free agents acquired

Free agents lost

Claimed via waivers

Lost via waivers

Players released

Lost via retirement

Player signings

Draft picks

Below are the Buffalo Sabres' selections at the 2017 NHL Entry Draft, which was held on June 23 and 24, 2017 at the United Center in Chicago.

Draft notes:
 The Minnesota Wild's second-round pick went to the Buffalo Sabres as the result of a trade on March 2, 2015 that sent Chris Stewart to Minnesota in exchange for this pick.
 The Washington Capitals' third-round pick went to the Buffalo Sabres as the result of a trade on February 23, 2016 that sent Mike Weber to Washington in exchange for this pick.

References

Buffalo Sabres seasons
Buffalo Sabres
Buffalo
Buffalo